Dennis L. Parrett (born October 30, 1959) is an American politician and former Democratic member of the Kentucky Senate. Parrett represented District 10 from January 4, 2011, to January 1, 2023. He considered running for Agriculture Commissioner of Kentucky in the 2015 elections but ultimately did not run. Senator Parrett was elected by the Senate Democratic Caucus as Minority Caucus Whip on August 23, 2017. Parrett earned a BS in agricultural economics from University of Kentucky. Instead of running for a fourth term in the Kentucky Senate in 2022, Parrett made the decision to retire. Consequently, the 10th district had no incumbent running and facing no opponent in the general election, the open seat was won by former Elizabethtown City Councilman, Matthew Deneen.

Electoral history
2014 Parrett was unopposed in the primary and general elections.
2010 To challenge District 10 incumbent Republican Senator Elizabeth Tori, Parrett was unopposed for the May 18, 2010 Democratic Primary and won the November 2, 2010 General election with 16,291 votes (51.7%) against Senator Tori.

References

External links
Official page at the Kentucky General Assembly
Campaign site

Dennis Parrett at Ballotpedia
Dennis L. Parrett at OpenSecrets

Place of birth missing (living people)
1959 births
Living people
Democratic Party Kentucky state senators
People from Elizabethtown, Kentucky
University of Kentucky alumni
21st-century American politicians